The James H. Wilkinson Prize in Numerical Analysis and Scientific Computing is awarded every four years by the Society for Industrial and Applied Mathematics (SIAM). The award, named in honor of James H. Wilkinson, is made for research in, or other contributions to, numerical analysis and scientific computing during the 6 years preceding the year of the award. The prizewinner receives the prize, with $2000 (US), at the autumn conference of SIAM and gives a lecture there. It is intended to stimulate younger scientists in the early years of their careers.

Prize winners
 1982 Björn Engquist
 1985 Charles S. Peskin
 1989 
 1993 James Demmel
 1997 Andrew M. Stuart
 2001 Thomas Y. Hou
 2005 Emmanuel Candès
 2009 Assyr Abdulle
 2013 Lexing Ying
 2017 Lek-Heng Lim
 2021 Stefan Güttel

See also 

 List of computer science awards
 List of mathematics awards

References

Computer science awards
Awards of the Society for Industrial and Applied Mathematics
Awards established in 1982